The Moglietti sanctuary (Italian: Santuario dei Moglietti) is a sanctuary devoted to Our Lady of Graces in the comune of Coggiola.

History 
The sanctuary was built from 1888 enlarging an ancient chapel dating back to the 18th century.

The site once was a wetland and the name Moglietti (from the local expression muijeit, swamp) remembers the past ambient. The place is also known as the battlefield because, according to the local tradition, there has been a battle between the citizen of Coggiola and Fra Dolcino and his fellows.

Description 
Today the sanctuary is composed by a small church, with apse, portico, belltower, and a small hostel. The ancient votive column with the fresco of the Virgin Mary with baby Jesus is still preserved in the church. In front of the sanctuary there is the characteristic fountain that can be found in every sanctuary in the Biellese territory.

Inside the church are exposed the many Ex voto donated by the devotees.

Bibliography

See also 
 CoEur - In the heart of European paths
 Path of Saint Charles

External links 
 Scheda sul santuario sul Censimento Santuari Cristiani in Italia
 http://www.biellaclub.it/_cultura/libri/Santuari-biellese/index.htm

References 

Religious buildings and structures in the Province of Biella
Tourist attractions in Piedmont
Biellese Alps
Coggiola